Governor Kennedy may refer to:

John Kennedy (British Army officer, born 1893) (1893–1970), Governor of Southern Rhodesia from 1947 to 1953
Arthur Kennedy (governor) (1809–1883), Governor of the Gambia, Sierra Leone, Western Australia, Vancouver Island, Hong Kong and Queensland for various periods between 1851 and 1883